Beauprea spathulaefolia is a species of flowering plants in the family Proteaceae. It is found in New Caledonia.

References

External links
 Beauprea spathulaefolia at The Plant List
 Beauprea spathulaefolia at Tropicos

spathulaefolia
Plants described in 1871
Flora of New Caledonia
Taxa named by Adolphe-Théodore Brongniart
Taxa named by Jean Antoine Arthur Gris